Cybersocket, Inc. is an American multimedia publishing company based in West Hollywood, California. It was founded in 1997 by Morgan Sommer and Tim Lutz.

Publishing
Since 1999, Cybersocket, Inc. has published an annual trade paperback guide to gay pornographic websites called the Cybersocket Gay Net Directory. The company also publishes a free, consumer-focused, monthly periodical called Cybersocket Magazine that covers gay adult films, websites, performers, novelties, and events. Cybersocket Magazine has an audited national circulation of 70,000 copies per issue.

Website
The official Cybersocket Website includes a free online version of Cybersocket Magazine, an expanded version of the Cybersocket Gay Net Directory, and reviews of gay pornographic videos and websites.

Adult Industry Events
In 2000, Cybersocket, Inc. established an annual event called the Cybersocket Web Awards. In addition, Cybersocket regularly hosts B2B networking events for the gay adult entertainment industry in conjunction with major adult industry gatherings such as the XBIZ Conference, The Phoenix Forum, and the European Summit.

References

External links
 
 "Cybersocket's Top 50 Porn Stars" - July 2009

Publishing companies of the United States